Prokoenenia is a genus of Prokoeneniid microwhip scorpions, first described by Carl Julius Bernhard Börner in 1901.

Species 
, the World Palpigradi Catalog accepts the following six species:

 Prokoenenia asiatica Condé, 1994 – Thailand
 Prokoenenia californica Silvestri, 1913 – US (California)
 Prokoenenia celebica Condé, 1994 – Indonesia (Sulawesi)
 Prokoenenia chilensis (Hansen, 1901) – Chile
 Prokoenenia javanica Condé, 1990 – Indonesia (Java)
 Prokoenenia wheeleri (Rucker, 1901) – US (Texas)

References 

Palpigradi